Briana Shepherd (born ) is a Western Australian journalist, reporter, and news presenter for the Australian Broadcasting Corporation. She has also worked as a model, ballet dancer and ballet teacher.

Shepard attended Perth Modern School. In 2005, at age 18, she joined the New York City Ballet, the first Australian to do so. Her career as a ballet dancer was the cause of several fractured and broken bones.
She was one of several dancers laid off in 2009, after which she returned to Perth.

She has worked as a model for Vivien's Model Management.

Shephard obtained a Bachelor of Communications, majoring in journalism and broadcasting, and a Graduate Certificate of Radio Broadcasting from Edith Cowan University, and began working for the ABC News Perth as journalist and reporter. In 2016, she filled in for James McHale reading the news. From August 2021 to June 2022 she presented the news on Friday-Sunday, while Charlotte Hamlyn was on maternity leave.

Shepard is the granddaughter of Terri Charlesworth, one of West Australian Ballet's inaugural dancers, and founder of the Charlesworth Ballet Institute. Shepard is a guest teacher at the Institute.

References

External links 

ABC News (Australia) presenters
Australian television journalists
Australian women journalists
Edith Cowan University alumni
Living people
People educated at Perth Modern School
Year of birth missing (living people)